Alfonso Castro Lorenzo (26 January 1939 – 1 August 2017), better known as Alfie Lorenzo, was a Filipino showbiz columnist, radio commentator, TV host and talent manager.

Early life
He was born on January 26, 1939, in Porac, Pampanga.

Career
Lorenzo was best known for managing talents like Judy Ann Santos, Karla Estrada, Jackie Forster, Gretchen Barretto and Sunshine Cruz, among others.

Filmography

Publicity staff

Technical staff

Publicist

Publicity and promotions

Publicity coordinator

Radio

Health
In 2010, Lorenzo also suffered a heart attack and had undergone emergency angioplasty.

Death
Lorenzo died on August 1, 2017, due to heart attack at the age of 78.

References

1939 births
2017 deaths
People from Pampanga
People from Manila
Talent managers
21st-century Filipino LGBT people